HMS Sleuth was a S-class submarine of the third batch built for the Royal Navy during World War II. She survived the war and was sold for scrap in 1958.

Design and description
The last 17 boats of the third batch were significantly modified from the earlier boats. They had a stronger hull, carried more fuel and their armament was revised. They displaced  on the surface and  submerged. The S-class submarines had a crew of 48 officers and ratings.

For surface running, the boats were powered by two  diesel engines, each driving one propeller shaft. When submerged each propeller was driven by a  electric motor. They could reach  on the surface and  underwater.

Sleuth was armed with six 21 inch (533 mm) torpedo tubes in the bow. She carried six reload torpedoes for a grand total of a dozen torpedoes. Twelve mines could be carried in lieu of the torpedoes. The boat was also equipped with a 4-inch (102 mm) deck gun.

Construction and career
HMS Sleuth was built by Cammell Laird and launched on 6 July 1944. So far she has been the only ship of the Royal Navy to bear the name Sleuth. The boat operated in the Pacific Far East for most of her wartime career, often in company with her sister, HMS Solent.  Together they sank fifteen Japanese sailing vessels and the Japanese auxiliary minesweeper Wa 3. Sleuth survived the Second World War and continued in service.  On 13 June 1952 she collided with the destroyer HMS Zephyr, while leaving Portland harbour. She put her stern through the side of Zephyr as she reversed out of her berth.  Sleuth was eventually sold.  She arrived at Charlestown on 15 September 1958 for breaking up.

Notes

References
 
  
 
 
 

 

British S-class submarines (1931)
1944 ships
Ships built on the River Mersey
World War II submarines of the United Kingdom
Royal Navy ship names